Bowling competitions at the 2021 Junior Pan American Games in Cali, Colombia, were scheduled to be held from November 28 to 30, 2021.

Medal summary

Medal table

Medalists

References

Bowling
Pan American Games
Qualification tournaments for the 2023 Pan American Games